The French Bulldog, is a French breed of companion dog or toy dog. It appeared in Paris in the mid-nineteenth century, apparently the result of cross-breeding of Toy Bulldogs imported from England and local Parisian ratters.

It is commonly kept as a pet, and is among the most frequently registered dogs in a number of countries including Australia, the United Kingdom, and the United States.

History 

From the beginning of the nineteenth century bulldogs were bred in the United Kingdom for purposes other than traditional blood sports such as bull-baiting, which were banned in 1835.

At the same time, lace workers from Nottingham who were displaced by the Industrial Revolution began to settle in Normandy, France. They brought a variety of dogs with them, including Toy Bulldogs. The dogs became popular in France and a trade in imported small Bulldogs was created, with breeders in England sending over Bulldogs that they considered to be too small, or with faults such as ears that stood up. By 1860, there were few Toy Bulldogs left in England, such was their popularity in France, and due to the exploits of specialist dog exporters.

The small Bulldog type gradually became thought of as a breed, and received a name, the Bouledogue Francais. This Francization of the English name is also a contraction of the words boule (ball) and dogue (mastiff). The dogs were highly fashionable and were sought after by society ladies and Parisian prostitutes alike, as well as creatives such as artists, writers, and fashion designers. The artists Edgar Degas and Henri de Toulouse-Lautrec are thought to have French Bulldogs in their paintings. However, records were not kept of the breed's development as it diverged further away from its original Bulldog roots. As it changed, terrier stock had been brought in to develop traits such as the breed's long straight ears.
Depictions in nineteenth-century paintings

Breed clubs and modern recognition 
Bulldogs were very popular in the past, especially in Western Europe. One of its ancestors was the English bulldog. Americans had been importing French Bulldogs for a while, but it was not until 1885 when they were brought over in order to set up an American-based breeding program. They were mostly owned by society ladies, who first displayed them at the Westminster Kennel Club Dog Show in 1896. They arrived again in the following year with even more entries, where the judging of the breed would go on to have future ramifications. The judge in question at the dog show,  George Raper, only chose winners with "rose ears"—ears that folded at the tip, as with the standard for Bulldogs. The ladies formed the French Bull Dog Club of America and created the breed standard which stated for the first time that the "erect bat ear" was the correct type.

In the early 20th century, the breed remained in vogue for high society, with dogs changing hands for up to $3,000 and being owned by members of influential families such as the Rockefellers and the J. P. Morgans. The American Kennel Club recognized the breed quickly after the breed club was formed, and by 1906 the French Bulldog was the fifth most popular dog breed in America. In 2013, the American Kennel Club (AKC) ranked the French Bulldog as the 10th most popular breed in the United States, enjoying a sharp rise in popularity from 54th place a decade before, in 2003.  By 2014, they had moved up to become the ninth most popular AKC registered dog breed in the US and by the 2017 they were the fourth most popular.

This new Bulldog breed arrived for the first time in England in 1893, with English Bulldog breeders in an uproar as the French imports did not meet the new breed standards in place by this time, and they wanted to prevent the English stock from crossbreeding with the French. The Kennel Club initially recognized them as a subset of the existing Bulldog breed rather than an entirely new breed. Some English breeders in this period bred the French Bulldogs in order to resurrect the Toy Bulldog. On 10 July 1902, at the house of Frederick W. Cousens, a meeting was held to set up a breed club in order to seek individual recognition for the French breed. The adopted breed standard was the same one which was already in use in America, France, Germany and Austria. Despite opposition from Miniature Bulldog (the new breed name for the Toy Bulldog) and Bulldog breeders, in 1905, the Kennel Club changed its policy on the breed and recognized them separate from the English variety, initially as the Bouledogue Francais, then later in 1912 with the name changed to the French Bulldog.

It is commonly kept as a pet: in 2020 it was the second-most registered dog in the United Kingdom, and the fourth-most in the United States. They were rated the third-most popular dog in Australia in 2017.  In 2019, in the United Kingdom, the French Bulldog had 375 export pedigrees and a total of 33,661 registered dogs. By comparison, the Labrador Retriever had over 36,700 dogs and the Cocker Spaniel fewer than 22,000.

Historic photographs

Description 
The American Kennel Club standard for the French Bulldog states that it should be muscular, with a soft and loose coat forming wrinkles. 

The AKC Standard weight for a French Bulldog is maximum 28 pounds.  The head of a French bulldog should be square shaped and large, with ears that resemble bat ears. French bulldogs are a flat-faced breed. Eyes that are AKC Standard approved for French Bulldogs are dark, almost to the point of being black; blue eyed French bulldogs are not AKC approved.  The coat of a French bulldog should be short haired and fine and silky. Acceptable colors under the breed standard are the various shades of brindle, fawn, cream or white with brindle patches (known as "pied"). The fawn colors can be any light through red.  The most common colors are brindle, then fawn, with pieds being less common than the other colors. The breed clubs do not recognize any other colors or patterns, because some colors come linked with genetic health problems not usually found in the breed. These include blue coloration, which is linked with a form of alopecia (hair loss or baldness), sometimes known as "blue dog alopecia". Even dogs that are not blue can develop "blue dog alopecia" or canine follicular dysplasia.

Temperament 
The French Bulldog, like many other companion dog breeds, requires close contact with humans. If left alone for more than a few hours, it may experience separation anxiety.

French Bulldogs are often kept as companions. The breed is patient and affectionate with their owners, and can live with other breeds. French Bulldogs are agreeable dogs, and are human-oriented, and this makes them easier to train,  though they do have tendencies to be stubborn.

They are ranked 58th in Stanley Coren's The Intelligence of Dogs. There are certain exceptions to this average level of canine intelligence; a French Bulldog named Princess Jacqueline which died in 1934 was claimed to be able to speak 20 words, in appropriate situations.

According to the American Kennel Club, the French Bulldog has overtaken the Labrador as the most popular breed of dog. Before 2023, Labradors had held the top spot for 31 years.

Health 

As a consequence of selective breeding, French Bulldogs are disproportionately affected by health related problems.

Brachycephalic airway obstructive syndrome 
The skull malformation brachycephaly was increased by breeding selection which led to the occurrence of the brachycephalic airway obstructive syndrome. Therefore many French Bulldogs often pant, sticking out their tongue even at slight efforts like walking. The brachycephalic syndrome causes them to have multiple side effects, as in difficulty breathing (which includes snoring, loud breathing). It happens because they have narrow nostril openings, a long soft palate, and fairly narrow tracheas. This issue can lead to death in French Bulldogs if they are not undergoing proper treatment.

In order to treat these dogs and create a smoother airway to the lungs, a procedure must be done that takes out a portion of their soft palate. The results of the procedure show a minimum of 60% better airway passage to the lungs.

In 2013, a UK Medical Study reviewed the health of 2228 French Bulldogs under veterinary care in the UK. The study found that 1612 (72.4%) of these French Bulldog had at least one recorded health issue: "The most common disorders recorded were ear infections (14.0%), diarrhea (7.5%) and conjunctivitis (3.2%). Skin problems were the most commonly reported group of disorders (17.9%). This study of over two thousand French Bulldogs provides a framework to identify the most important health priorities in French Bulldogs in the UK and can assist with reforms to improve health and welfare within the breed."

Temperature regulation-related issues 

As they are a brachycephalic breed, French Bulldogs are banned by several commercial airlines due to the numbers that have died while in the air. This is because dogs with snub noses find it difficult to breathe when they are hot and stressed. The temperature in a cargo space in an aircraft can rise as high as  when waiting on the runway.

Birth and reproduction 
French Bulldogs sometimes require artificial insemination and, frequently, Caesarean section to give birth, with over 80% of litters delivered this way.

Back and spine 

French Bulldogs are prone to having congenital hemivertebrae (also called "butterfly vertebrae"), which will show on an X-ray.

In October 2010, the UK French Bulldog Health Scheme was launched. The scheme consists of three levels: the first level, Bronze, designates a basic veterinary check which covers all the Kennel Club Breed Watch points of concern for the breed. The next level, Silver, requires a DNA test for hereditary cataracts, a simple cardiology test, and patella grading. The final level, Gold, requires a hip score and a spine evaluation.  The European and UK French Bulldog fanciers and Kennel Clubs are moving away from the screw, cork-screw or 'tight' tail (which is an inbreed spinal defect), and returning to the short drop tail which the breed originally had. The UK breed standard requires that the tail be "undocked, set low, thick at root, tapering quickly towards tip, preferably straight, and long enough to cover anus" and "never curling over back nor carried gaily".
The French Bulldog may develop skin fold dermatitis.

References 

Bulldog breeds
Companion dogs
Dog breeds originating in France
FCI breeds